Dieter Domke (born 9 February 1987) is a German badminton player.

Achievements

European Games 
Men's singles

European Junior Championships
Boys' singles

BWF Grand Prix 
The BWF Grand Prix has two levels, the BWF Grand Prix and Grand Prix Gold. It is a series of badminton tournaments sanctioned by the Badminton World Federation (BWF) since 2007.

Men's singles

 BWF Grand Prix Gold tournament
 BWF Grand Prix tournament

BWF International Challenge/Series
Men's singles

 BWF International Challenge tournament
 BWF International Series tournament
 BWF Future Series tournament

References

External links
 
 
 

1987 births
Living people
People from Kostanay
German male badminton players
Badminton players at the 2015 European Games
European Games bronze medalists for Germany
European Games medalists in badminton